Bucculatrix hypsiphila is a moth in the family Bucculatricidae. It is found in Peru. It was described by Edward Meyrick in 1915.

References

Natural History Museum Lepidoptera generic names catalog

Bucculatricidae
Moths described in 1915
Taxa named by Edward Meyrick
Moths of South America